The Loys Station Covered Bridge is a multiple king post wooden covered bridge near Thurmont, Maryland.  The bridge was burned by an arsonist in 1991 and rebuilt using surviving framing. The original bridge spanned 90 feet in one span, but has since been modified with a pier at the middle of the span.  The bridge crosses Owen's Creek and is surrounded by a park.

History
Loys Station Covered Bridge was originally built in 1848.   Between 1929 and 1930 the bridge was reinforced with a concrete pier and steel beams.  The bridge gets its name from a Western Maryland Railroad station that stopped nearby the bridge in Loys.  In 1978 the bridge was added to the National Register of Historic Places.  In 1991 the bridge was burned down by an arsonist who was trying to fraudulently collect insurance money.  The bridge took three years and $300,000 to rebuild and was rebuilt to match the bridge as it was in 1930 after having been reinforced.  Most of the cost of reconstructing the bridge was covered by insurance.  On 4 July 1994 the bridge officially reopened for the public.  In October 2013 the bridge was damaged twice by vehicles, but quickly repaired both times.

References

External links

, including photo in 1997, at Maryland Historical Trust

Covered bridges on the National Register of Historic Places in Maryland
Wooden bridges in Maryland
Bridges in Frederick County, Maryland
Road bridges in Maryland
National Register of Historic Places in Frederick County, Maryland
Covered bridges in the United States destroyed by arson